Abingdon Borough Police was the police force responsible for policing the Borough of Abingdon, situated in the county of Berkshire, England until 1889.

It was formed as a result of the Municipal Corporations Act 1835.  The force was amalgamated into the Berkshire Constabulary following the Local Government Act 1888, which required all boroughs with populations of less than 10,000 to amalgamate their police forces with their adjoining county constabulary.

Today, the area is policed by the successor to Berkshire Constabulary, Thames Valley Police.

References

Defunct police forces of England
History of Berkshire